Mikel Leshoure (born March 30, 1990) is a former American football running back. He was drafted by the Detroit Lions in the second round of the 2011 NFL Draft. He played college football at Illinois.

Early years
Leshoure attended Centennial High School in Champaign, Illinois. During his career, he rushed for 4,652 yards on 681 carries and scored 52 rushing touchdowns.

College career
As a freshman at the University of Illinois, Leshoure played sparingly collecting 126 yards on 35 carries.  Leshoure first received a significant amount of playing time as a sophomore, playing in 12 games and running for 734 yards on only 108 carries.  During the 2010 season, Leshoure rushed for 1697 yards on 281 carries (126.1 yards per game, which was eighth best in the nation) with 17 touchdowns, playing in all 13 games. and capping off the season by scoring three touchdowns in the Illini's 38-14 victory over Baylor in the 2010 Texas Bowl. He also is the Illinois single game rushing record holder by rushing for 330 yards against Northwestern.

Statistics

Professional career

Detroit Lions
Leshoure was taken with the 57th overall pick in the second round of the 2011 NFL Draft by the Detroit Lions. On August 8, 2011, Leshoure tore his Achilles tendon in practice after a collision with Cliff Avril, and missed his entire rookie season.

After being suspended for the first two games of the 2012 season and missing his entire rookie season, Leshoure made his NFL debut in Week 3 against the Tennessee Titans. Leshoure had 26 carries for 100 yards and a touchdown, but the Lions lost 44-41 in overtime.

On August 30, 2014, Leshoure was released by the Lions as a 53-man roster cut.

BC Lions
Leshoure signed with the BC Lions on February 5, 2016. He was released by the team on May 5, 2016.

See also
 List of NCAA major college football yearly scoring leaders

References

External links
 Illinois profile
 

1990 births
Living people
American football running backs
Canadian football running backs
BC Lions players
Detroit Lions players
Illinois Fighting Illini football players
Sportspeople from Champaign, Illinois
Players of American football from Illinois
African-American players of American football
African-American players of Canadian football
21st-century African-American sportspeople